Alexandre Usov (born 27 August 1977 in Minsk) is a Belarusian racing cyclist. His specialty is sprinting.

Major results

2000
 1st, Stage 10, Tour de l'Avenir
2001
 1st, Stages 3 & 5, Niedersachsen-Rundfahrt
 1st, Stage 1, Tour de l'Avenir
2002
  Road Race Champion
 1st, Stage 2, Tour de l'Avenir
 1st, Stage 1, Tour du Poitou-Charentes
2003
 1st, Trofeo Soller
 1st, Trofeo Cala Millor
 1st, Stage 1, Clásica Internacional de Alcobendas
2004
 1st, Berner Rundfahrt
 1st, Stage 5, Volta a la Comunitat Valenciana
2005
 1st, Stage 4, Hessen Rundfahrt
 1st, Stage 1, Circuit des Ardennes
 1st, Stage 1, Boucles de la Mayenne
 2nd, GP Plouay
2007
 1st, Stage 4, Tour du Limousin
2008
 1st, Stage 7, Tour de Langkawi
2009
 1st, Mountains Classification, Tour de Luxembourg

External links

Belarusian male cyclists
1977 births
Living people
Olympic cyclists of Belarus
Cyclists at the 2004 Summer Olympics
Cyclists at the 2008 Summer Olympics
Cyclists from Minsk